Dahl Al Hamam is a district in Qatar, located in the municipality of Ad Dawhah.

Together with Madinat Khalifa North, which it is adjacent to in the south-west, it makes up Zone 32 which has a population of 12,364.

Etymology
In Arabic, dahl translates to "cavern". The second constituent, "hamam", translates to pigeon. The district earned its name from a prominent cavern, presently found in Dahl Al Hamam Park, in which pigeons frequently laid their eggs.

Visitor attractions

Dahl Al Hamam Park is among the most popular parks in Qatar. Most notable about the park is the presence of an iconic cavern in its northern section which earned the district its name. 

For the landscaping, over 50 ornamental plants are found throughout the park, many non-native to the country. Occasionally, concerts and theatrical plays are held in the park's amphitheater. 

There are three playgrounds for children of varying ages. The park is equipped with typical amenities, such as outdoor seating, bathrooms and a restaurant.

Also found in the district is the Qatar Social Cultural Centre for the Blind.

Transport
Major roads that run through the district are Al Markhiya Street and Al Shamal Road.

References

Communities in Doha